The 81st Infantry Division was a division of the Philippine Army under the United States Army Forces in the Far East (USAFFE). It was established in the prewar period and fought 1941-1942.

Organization 
 81st Infantry Regiment (PA) (commander, Ruperto Kangleon)
 82nd Infantry Regiment (PA) 
 83rd Infantry Regiment (PA) 
 84th Provisional Infantry Regiment (PA) 
 81st Field Artillery Regiment (PA) (LCol. Joh P. Woodbridge) (81st F.A. transferred to 102nd Division)
 HQ Company 
 1st Bn/81st FA Regt (PA) (75mm guns, 8x) (guns & ammunition never arrived; sunk on the SS Corregidor, 17 Dec 1941) 
 2nd Bn/81st FA Regt (PA) (3-inch guns, 6x) (guns & ammunition never arrived; sunk on the SS Corregidor, 17 Dec 1941) 
 3rd Bn/81st FA Regt (PA) 
 81st Engineer Battalion (PA) 
 81st Division Units (PA) 
 81st Division Headquarters & HQ Company (PA)
 81st Medical Battalion (PA) 
 81st Signal Company (PA) 
 81st Quartermaster Company (Motorized) (PA)
 81st QM Transport Company (Truck) (PA)

History
It was active from 1941 to 10 May 1942, whereupon it surrendered after Corregidor fell.  It was active in Mindanao. Colonel (later Brigadier General) Guy O. Fort (PA) was the division's commander, and was later tortured and executed by the Japanese, apparently because he would not comply with their frustrated attempts to use him for propaganda in Mindanao.

The 81st Division was known as the Moro Bolo Battalion due to their use of the bolo, a machete-like tool.

Combat Narrative
After the Japanese invasion of the Philippines in December 1941, it formed part of Visayan-Mindanao Force under Brigadier General (later Major General) William F. Sharp, HQ originally at Cebu City.

Sources

References

Bibliography
Morton, Louis. The Fall of the Philippines (Publication 5-2) . Retrieved on 14 Feb 2017. 

Infantry divisions of the Philippines
Military units and formations of the Philippine Army in World War II
Military units and formations established in 1941
Military units and formations disestablished in 1942